Knockroe Passage Tomb is a prehistoric site, of the Neolithic period, in the townland of Knockroe in County Kilkenny, Ireland, about 10 km north of Carrick-on-Suir. It is known locally as "The Caiseal".

It is National Monument no. 655, managed by the Office of Public Works on behalf of the state.

Description
There are two chambers on the site: the larger western chamber is aligned so that sunlight at sunset at the winter solstice shines along the passageway. There is artwork on many of the stones lining the passageway. Quartz is scattered around the site: this may have formed a wall at the entrances. The chambers would originally have been covered with earth.

There are similarities with the tombs at Newgrange and Knowth (both in County Meath).

Excavations, led by Muiris O'Sullivan of the Department of Archaeology at University College Dublin, have been conducted for several years at the site.

See also
 List of National Monuments in County Kilkenny
 List of megalithic monuments in Ireland
 Irish megalithic tombs

References

Archaeological sites in County Kilkenny
National Monuments in County Kilkenny
Tombs in the Republic of Ireland